List of the National Register of Historic Places listings in Ulster County, New York

This is intended to be a complete list of properties and districts listed on the National Register of Historic Places in Ulster County, New York.  The locations of National Register properties and districts (at least for all showing latitude and longitude coordinates below) may be seen in a map by clicking on "Map of all coordinates". Eight of the properties and districts are further designated as U.S. National Historic Landmarks.  Photographs of many of these buildings may be found in Dutch Houses in the Hudson Valley Before 1776.



Listings county-wide

|}

Former listing

|}

See also

National Register of Historic Places listings in New York

References

External links

Kingston, New York National Register of Historic Places travel itinerary

Ulster County